Night of the Flood is a Canadian drama film, directed by Bernar Hébert and released in 1996. An experiment in integrating dance and theatrical staging into cinema, the film tells the story of a child born in a flooded land; his mother (Geneviève Rochette) was the sole survivor of the flood after floating to safety on a raft built by the child's deceased father (Jacques Godin) and being cared for by a guardian angel (Julie McClemens). The film also prominently features the dance troupe O Vertigo, performing dances choreographed by Ginette Laurin.

The film premiered at the 1996 Montreal World Film Festival.

The film received four Genie Award nominations at the 18th Genie Awards in 1997, for Best Cinematography (Serge Ladouceur), Best Art Direction/Production Design (Serge Bureau), Best Costume Design (Yveline Bonjean and Liz Vandal) and Best Original Score (Serge LaForest and Gaëtan Gravel).

References

External links
 

1996 films
Canadian drama films
Quebec films
Canadian dance films
1996 drama films
French-language Canadian films
1990s Canadian films